Skal vi vædde en million? is a 1932 Danish romantic drama film directed by George Schnéevoigt, and written by frequent collaborators Fleming Lynge and Paul Sarauw. The film stars Frederik Jensen and marked the film debut of Marguerite Viby.

Cast
Frederik Jensen ...  Generalkonsul Godtfred Winterfeldt 
Marguerite Viby ...  Korpigen Aurora 
Hans Kurt ...  Jørgen Winterfeldt 
Lili Lani ...  Elly Martin 
Hans W. Petersen ...  Komponist J. Jansøe 
Mathilde Nielsen ...  Frk. Mortensen

External links
 

1930s Danish-language films
1932 films
1932 romantic drama films
Danish black-and-white films
Films directed by George Schnéevoigt
Danish romantic drama films